La Gente Naranja (The Orange People) is an Ecuadorian rock en español band based in Miami, Florida. La Gente Naranja started in 2009 with band members Eddie Garcia (vocals and guitar), Jose Nouel (drums) and Diego Saa (vocals and bass guitar). The group made its first breakthrough in 2010 with the release of the music video for their first single "Luz al Sur", and their debut album of the same name.

Discography and highlights

Albums

Luz al Sur
 Released: 2010
 Label: Nextstar
 Song List
 Misil
 Rosa En Mi Jardin
 Luz al Sur
 Elevador
 Vision Platonica
 Un Dia Mas Sin Ti
 Lo Inexplicable
 Diamante
 Botellas Vacias
 Ghetto Booty
 Official Singles:
"Luz al Sur" (Light from the South)

Videos
Luz al Sur (Southern Light 2010)

External links
 La Gente Naranja official website
 La Gente Naranja Official YouTube channel
 Luz al Sur (Light from the South) Official Video in YouTube

Rock en Español music groups
Ecuadorian musical groups
Musical groups established in 2009